The first 2013 Kenyan Super Cup was a Kenyan football match which was contested by 2012 Kenyan Premier League champions Tusker and 2012 FKF President's Cup champions Gor Mahia at the Nyayo National Stadium in Nairobi on 23 February. The latter won the match 5–4 on penalties to win the match and the trophy.

Road to Cup

2012 Kenyan Premier League standings

2012 FKF President's Cup bracket

Match details

See also
 2013 Kenyan Super Cup (post-season)
 2012 Kenyan Super Cup

References

Super Cup 1
2013 1